The Dr Croke Cup is the trophy presented to the winner of the All Ireland Secondary Schools Senior "A" hurling championship. Before that it was an inter-county GAA competition in hurling. The first Croke Cups (which included hurling and Gaelic football) took place between 1896 and 1915. Clare was the first winner of the Dr Croke Cup for hurling in 1896. In 1909 Ulster were expelled from the Dr Croke Cup because of "bad gates" but the decision was later rescinded. Since 1944 however, it is the pinnacle of colleges hurling to win the "Dr Croke Cup", named after Thomas Croke, Archbishop of Cashel, in whose honour Croke Park is also named.

Current format
For official fixtures and results see Croke Cup at gaa.ie.

Six school teams currently compete in the Dr Croke Cup, namely the winners and beaten finalists in the Connacht A championship, the winners and beaten finalists in the Leinster A Championship and the winners and beaten finalists in the Dr Harty Cup (Munster A Championship). The winners of the  Mageean Cup (Ulster A Championship) compete in the Paddy Buggy Cup (All-Ireland B Championship) as Ulster hurling is considered weak in comparison to the other three provinces.

The three beaten finalists and one of the provincial champions contest the two quarter-finals with the winners meeting the remaining two provincial champions in the semi-finals. All matches are knock-out.

Wins listed by college

Finals listed by year

Football finals 1896 to 1914

Cup presented to All-Ireland winners

See also
Schools' Hurling
Leinster Championship
Dr Harty Cup (Munster Championship)

Schools' Football
Hogan Cup (Football Championship)

External links
55 Years of the Croke Cup
 Complete Roll of Honour on Kilkenny GAA bible

References

All-Ireland Hurling Championships
All-Ireland inter-county hurling championships
Hurling cup competitions